is a 1983 Japanese anime epic science fiction film and the fifth film (fourth theatrical) of the Space Battleship Yamato saga (known as Star Blazers in the United States). Its extended 70mm cut was the longest animated film in the world for 36 years, until it was surpassed by In This Corner (and Other Corners) of the World, the 2019 extended cut of 2016's In This Corner of the World, by five minutes.

Synopsis 
The water planet Aquarius is heading towards Earth after flooding the home planet of the warrior race of the Dinguil. The Dinguil use warp technology to make the planet move towards Earth faster than usual. The warrior race plans to flood Earth and make it their new home. When Earth learns of this, they make plans to evacuate humanity. Unfortunately, the Dinguil destroy the evacuation fleets. The space battleship Yamato, under the newly revived Jyuzo Okita (who seemingly died in the first season of the original series) now has to fight the Dinguil and stop Aquarius from flooding the Earth.

Cast 
 Kei Tomiyama as Susumu Kodai
 Yoko Asagami as Yuki Mori
 Goro Naya as Juzo Okita
 Chika Sakamoto as Jiro Shima
 Akira Kamiya as Shiro Kato
 Ichiro Nagai as Dr. Sakezo Sado
 Isao Sasaki as Daisuke Shima
 Jun Hazumi as EDF Officer
 Kazue Ikura as Dingir Boy
 Kazuo Hayashi as Yasuo Nanbu
 Kenichi Ogata as Analyzer
 Koji Yada as Talan
 Masane Tsukayama as Lugal II
 Masato Ibu as Desler / Heikuro Todo
 Mikio Terashima as Sho Yamazaki
 Osamu Kobayashi as Captain Mizutani
 Reiko Tajima as Queen of Aquarius
 Rokuro Naya as Dingir Officer
 Shinji Nomura as Giichi Aihara
 Takeshi Aono as Shiro Sanada
 Taro Ishida as Lugal I
 Toru Furuya as Tasuke Tokugawa
 Yoshito Yasuhara as Kenjiro Ota
 Tatsuya Nakadai as Narrator

Reception 
The film made ¥1.72 billion at the Japanese box office.

Alternate endings 
There are three alternate endings that were included in the theatrical and home video releases.

Notes

References

External links 
Starblazers Official website   now defunct
 
 

1983 anime films
1980s science fiction action films
Animated films based on animated series
Films directed by Tomoharu Katsumata
Films set in the 23rd century
Japanese animated science fiction films
1980s Japanese-language films
Space Battleship Yamato films
Films scored by Kentarō Haneda